Tullynabeherny (Irish derived place name, Tulaigh na Beithearnaí meaning 'The Hill of the Birchland'.) is a townland in the civil parish of Kildallan, barony of Tullyhunco, County Cavan, Ireland.

Geography

Tullynabeherny is bounded on the east by Greaghacholea townland, on the south by Doogary townland and on the north by Kiltynaskellan townland. Its chief geographical features are small streams and forestry plantations. Tullynabeherny is traversed by minor public roads and rural lanes. The townland covers just 10 acres.

History

From medieval times up to the early 1600s, the land belonged to the McKiernan Clan.

The Tullynabeherny Valuation Office books are available for May 1838.

In the 19th century the land belonged to the estate of Earl Annesley.

Griffith's Valuation of 1857 lists one landholder in the townland.

Census

References

External links
 The IreAtlas Townland Data Base

Townlands of County Cavan